The Press are an American Oi! band. Formed in New York City in 1984, the outspoken anti-fascist band were early members of Skinheads Against Racial Prejudice. Vocalist André Schlesinger also supported the views of the British Socialist Workers Party, and this was reflected in some of the band's lyrics. Their songs appeared on several compilation albums, as well as a posthumous CD collection of their recordings called The Complete Press: 1984-1994, released in 2007 by Insurgence Records, re-released on vinyl in 2017.  Their song "21 Guitar Salute" has been covered by Dropkick Murphys and Hawkins Thugs; in 2000 The Franks recorded a version of The Press' "It's Not What I Want." In 2019 The Press’ song "Revolution Now" was recorded by another New York-based band, The Take.

The Press reformed in 2016, following the death of founding member André Schlesinger, and has been releasing new songs and records since 2017.

Members
Scotti Lyons: vocals
J. Christopher Noone: vocals, guitar
Scott Roberts: vocals, guitar
James Marshall: vocals, bass
Jordan Pontell: vocals, guitar, bass
Max Duggan: drums

Former members
André Schlesinger: lead vocals, guitar
Bob "Dextrose" Rodrigues: vocals, drums
John Monahan: vocals, guitar
Andy Guida: drums
Pete Parneros: drums
Gideon Greenburg: bass
Tom Hamilton: drums
Mike Alba: guitar
Leon the Hippy: drums

Discography
Albums
Skins 'N' Punks Volume 5: The US Connection, (Split LP with The Radicts), 1989, Oi! Records
The Complete Press 1984-1994, 2007, (CD version) Insurgence Records
The Complete Press 1984-1994, 2017, (Vinyl version) Insurgence Records

EPs and singles
"Is It Any Wonder?" 1994, TNP Records
The Press/The Brass Split EP,  2018, Insurgence Records
Torch EP, 2018, Oi! The Boat Records

Compilations
New York Beat: Hit And Run, 1986, Moon Records (released in Europe by Oi! Records as Skaville USA)
The Dumpster, 1988, Dimebag Tapes (Cassette-only release)
The Spirit Of 69 - Oi Classics Vol. II, 1994, Street Kid's Records
Oi! Skampilation Vol. #1, 1995, Radical Records
The Best of Oi! Records, 1997, Oi! Records
Northern Aggression - Project Boneyard Volume II, 2009, Insurgence Records
Rock Against Racism - Then, Now, Forever, 2018, All Systems Go Records
Let's Make Some Noise Together - NYC Volume 1, 2019, Let's Make Some Noise Together (Online only)

References

External links

 Official Facebook page
Tribute to The Press
 Interview with The Press
This is a 21 guitar salute to The Press, the very first US Oi! band. - column by Garry Bushell about The Press
Interview with Andre Schlesinger about The Press
Interview with Andre Schlesinger that mentions The Press
Video clip of the first SHARP benefit show in NYC circa 1987 featuring The Press
Video clip of The Press, live circa 1992
Scanned interview with André Schlesinger about The Press in Maximumrocknroll, No. 304, September 2008
Remembering André Schlesinger of The Press

Punk rock groups from New York (state)
Oi! groups
American anti-fascists
Musical groups established in 1984